is a city located in Kagoshima Prefecture, Japan. It is located west of Kirishima and north of Kagoshima.

The modern city of Aira was established on March 23, 2010, from the merger of the former town of Aira, absorbing the towns of Kajiki and Kamō (all from Aira District).

As of October 1, 2020, the city has a population of 76,405 and a population density of 330.3 persons per km². The total area is 231.32 km².

It is accessed with the Kyushu Expressway at interchange 25, the Kajiki Interchange and interchange 26, the Aira Interchange. The expressway passed through Aira, connecting Kagoshima to the west and Kirishima to the North. The interchange was first opened on December 13, 1973. There are five railway stations in the city. From east to west, Kajiki, Kinkō, Chōsa, Aira and Shigetomi stations serve the city. All of these stations belong to Nippō Main Line, and are operated by Kyushu Railway Company (JR Kyushu).

Aira's claim to fame is a stone gate in the village of Yamada which commemorates the victory of the Russo-Japanese War.

The plan for the merger of the three towns was defeated twice. Once in 2005 and again in 2008. These defeats were due to a debt in public finance and the number of seats in the city council. Finally, in 2009, town representatives compromised with these problems and the merger plan was accepted. Aira District will be left with one municipality.

Geography

Surrounding municipalities
Kagoshima Prefecture
Kagoshima
Kirishima
Satsuma
Satsumasendai

Demography
According to Japanese census data, this is the population of Aira in recent years.

Climate
Aira has a humid subtropical climate (Köppen climate classification Cfa). Most of the rainfall is concentrated from June to September. Typhoons often strike from summer to autumn. In addition, Sakurajima is located about 20 km south of the city, and volcanic ash may fall when a northerly wind blows during volcanic activity. As with other cities, towns and villages in the mainland of Kagoshima Prefecture, the forecast of wind direction over Sakurajima, which is reported in the weather forecast, is of great concern.

Notable people
 Munenori Kawasaki - professional baseball player
 Kota Ibushi - Japanese professional wrestler
 Shoji Jo - professional football player

See also
 Aira Caldera

References

External links
Aira City official website 

Cities in Kagoshima Prefecture